The Socastee Historic District, located on the Intracoastal Waterway in Socastee, South Carolina, was added to the National Register of Historic Places in 2002.

It includes three contributing buildings, one contributing site, and one contributing structure. They are a metal swing bridge, two houses, one store and a pecan grove. It is one of the few remaining intact local examples of post-Civil War development.

Samuel S. Sarvis House 

Samuel Sarvis built his house in 1881, shortly before he was to be married.

Thomas B. Cooper House 

The Thomas B. Cooper house was built for Mr. Cooper by Robert M. Prince, Jr. in 1908.
The exterior has recently been renovated.

Thomas B. Cooper Store 

The store was built in 1905 and closed in 1932.

Swing Bridge 

The Socastee swing bridge was designed by the U.S. Corps of engineers, it is a swing-span, Warren through-truss type bridge with rigid joints and was opened in 1936.
A pamphlet printed for the opening of the Waterway in Socastee in 1936, discloses the Socastee Bridge was built by the Tidewater Construction Corporation. According to a 1981 South Carolina Highway Department Survey, however, the bridge contains a plate bearing the name of Virginia Bridge & Iron Company.
It is most likely the pieces for the bridge itself was fabricated by the Virginia Bridge & Iron Company, and was assembled by Tidewater Construction Corporation. 
Originally, the bridge had to be turned by hand. The gatekeeper worked from the house at the top of the bridge. The first operator of the bridge boarded at the Thomas B. Cooper house.

From the time of its construction, the Socastee turn bridge was the only means other than ferry to cross the Intra Coastal waterway.  Located on Hwy 544, it was to be closed after approval of a new bridge to be built on south of the Socastee bridge. Though the new bridge solved many traffic problems during the tourist season, it did not help the locals and it would have created many problems for Socastee residents that need to access Forestbrook Rd., which is located approximately 0.2 miles on the right off Hwy 544 west of the Socastee turn bridge.  Additionally Peach Tree Rd. was located just 0.1 miles to the left. Thus the Socastee turn bridge not only has historic value, but it is still used in daily commuting.

Pecan Grove 

Old pecan grove near the Thomas B. Cooper store.

Early Residents

Samuel S. Sarvis (1843 - 1931)
Samuel S. Sarvis was a confederate veteran and served with the SC 26th Infantry.  He was a merchant, store owner and a business partner with Dusenbury & Sarvis.  Mr. Sarvis was appointed the postmaster of Socastee in 1896.  The post office was in his store which was the norm for small towns in that era.

Thomas B. Cooper (1863 - 1928)

Thomas B. Cooper was the Socastee postmaster in 1908.

References

External links
Socastee Historic District Map
Socastee Historic District - Socastee, South Carolina - U.S. National Register of Historic Places on Waymarking.com

Historic districts on the National Register of Historic Places in South Carolina
Buildings and structures in Horry County, South Carolina
National Register of Historic Places in Horry County, South Carolina